The Jealous God is a novel by John Braine which was first published in 1964. Set in the early 1960s among the Irish Catholic community in a small Yorkshire town, the book is about a 30-year-old mummy's boy and his attempts at liberating himself from his domineering mother. The title refers to the latter's wish that her "favourite" son, although already rather old for following his alleged vocation, become a clergyman. It was said that it was John Braine's personal favourite novel of all those that he wrote and was finally filmed in 2005.

Summary
Vincent Dungarvan is a history teacher at a Catholic school for boys. Whereas his two brothers Matthew and Paul have been married with children for many years, Vincent is still single and living at home with his widowed mother, who is also a teacher. At 30 he is still a virgin. He has gone out with one or two nice Catholic girls but has rejected them when he found them too superficial and boring.

One day, in the local library, he encounters Laura, a new librarian. Fascinated by her good looks and driven by, as he sees it, sinful desire, he is for once able to overcome his shyness and asks her out. Laura accepts, they immediately fall in love with each other and start dating on a regular basis. However, he prefers not to tell his possessive mother about her let alone invite her home.

In the course of the following weeks Vincent's life is shattered by a number of revelations concerning Laura. He is disappointed when she tells him that she is a Protestant and that, on top of that, she has stopped going to church altogether. What is more, through a deliberate indiscretion by Laura's flatmate Ruth, he learns that Laura is divorced. For him as a Catholic, this means that he is seeing a married woman, and both his guilt and his helplessness about the situation increase enormously. Accordingly, they break up their relationship.

Surprisingly, soon afterwards Vincent loses his virginity with Maureen, his sister-in-law, while his brother Matthew has gone out and the children are asleep. On the following morning, back at his mother's, he recollects what happened the previous evening:

That very day, Vincent has an appointment with a senior clergyman about his vocation and once and for all makes up his mind not to become a priest. He also decides to see Laura again. In the meantime she has settled down in a flat of her own, and this is where they have sex for the first time, without Vincent confessing to Laura that he has recently made love to his own sister-in-law. When, some weeks later, Maureen announces that she is pregnant again, he is of course afraid that he might be the father of her baby. Out of jealousy, Maureen writes Laura's ex-husband Robert an anonymous letter, urging him to make up with his wife again. Vincent and Laura split up again as Laura is not certain about her husband's intentions.

In the end two instances of deus ex machina resolve the complicated situation. First, Maureen has a miscarriage, freeing Vincent of any doubt that he might have fathered an illegitimate child. Then Robert commits suicide, paving the way for a Catholic wedding between Vincent and Laura, who are planning to leave the past behind and start a new life somewhere else.

Quote
"Muyah! There's no friendship between grown men and grown women, and no one can tell me different." (See also When Harry Met Sally....)

Film

The novel was adapted as a feature film and released to British cinemas in 2005. The writer-director was Steven Woodcock. Jason Merrells played Vincent, Denise Welch played Maureen, and Mairead Carty played Laura. Other actors featured were Marcia Warren (Mrs Dungarvan), Andrew Dunn (Matthew) and Roy Walker (the Monsignor). Allan Gill School boy #4 (uncredited)

Other reading
For a spiritual account by a convert to Roman Catholicism, see the writings of Ronald Knox.
For a fictional treatment of the lives of Catholics in England in the 20th century, see the novels of David Lodge, in particular The British Museum Is Falling Down and How Far Can You Go?.
For an example of the motif of the evil mother, see Christopher Isherwood's novel All the Conspirators.
For a light-hearted look at adultery, see Iris Murdoch's A Severed Head.

See also

 The Jealous God
1964 in literature

1964 British novels
Adultery in novels
British novels adapted into films
Novels set in Yorkshire
Catholic novels
Eyre & Spottiswoode books
Novels by John Braine